The battle of Vianden took place November 19, 1944 in the small town of Vianden, in northern Luxembourg. It was one of the most important battles of the Luxembourg Resistance during World War II.

Prelude 
While the Grand-Duchy of Luxembourg had been liberated by U.S. Army forces in September 1944, the German troops pulled back to Germany and took up new defensive positions along the border rivers Moselle, Sauer and Our. As soon as the country was liberated, Luxembourgish resistance members formed a militia across the country and were equipped with arms and ammunition by the United States Army.

Most of the Luxembourgish militia took up positions at the German border and occupied the important observation posts along the Rivers Our and Sauer. One of the most important posts was Vianden Castle from which the Luxembourgers could look deep into German territory and report German troop movements to the Allied Forces.

First action 
On the 15th of November, Luxembourgish militia members spotted a German patrol between Wiesen and Bettel and decided to strike. Five of the eleven German soldiers in the patrol were killed by the Luxembourgers who suffered no casualties. After this incident the German command decided to recapture the castle of Vianden.

The leader of the resistance, Victor Abens, evacuated the civilians of Vianden but nevertheless decided that his 30 militia men should remain in the town and in the castle to defend it. In the following days, the U.S. Army supported the Luxembourgers in Vianden with weapons and ammunition before leaving the town.

Battle 

On Sunday morning, 19 November, the Germans attacked the town with 250 soldiers of the Waffen-SS. After bombarding the town and the castle with grenade launchers the German soldiers began to attack the castle itself which was defended and fortified by four members of the Luxembourgish militia.

After heavy fighting around the castle, six German soldiers breached the defences via the gate of the castle, only to be involved in house-to-house fighting inside the castle. After sustaining several casualties, the Germans withdrew from the castle and concentrated their force on the town, but the strong resistance offered by the militia forced the Germans to abandon their assault and withdraw to the other side of the river to Germany.

Aftermath 
Eighteen German soldiers were killed during the main battle. The 30 men of the Luxembourgish militia suffered only one dead, with three being seriously wounded, and three more slightly wounded. A single civilian was killed when a grenade exploded in her home.

When the Germans launched the Battle of the Bulge a month later, the 30 men of the Luxembourgish militia, being hopelessly outnumbered, abandoned Vianden and withdrew to the unoccupied south of the country. Most of them continued their engagement by helping the U.S. Forces during the battle.

References

Footnotes

Bibliography

External links 
 Miliz Vianden - Fédération des enrôlés de force

1944 in Luxembourg
Battles of World War II involving Germany
Luxembourg in World War II
November 1944 events
Vianden